College of the Pacific is the liberal arts core of the University of the Pacific and offers degrees in the natural sciences, social sciences, humanities, and the fine and performing arts. The College houses 18 academic departments in addition to special programs such as gender studies, ethnic studies and film studies. A total of 31 majors and 36 minors are offered, and students may self-design a major or minor. In all, over 80 undergraduate majors are available across the University of the Pacific's schools and colleges. The College of the Pacific is located on the Stockton, California campus. Dr. Rena Fraden is the current Dean of the College.

History
The College of the Pacific is the original and largest unit of the University of the Pacific. The University of the Pacific was founded in 1851 in Santa Clara, California and was renamed the College of the Pacific in 1911, to reflect its primary heritage as an undergraduate liberal arts college. Note that the institution moved from Santa Clara to San Jose in 1871. In 1924, President Tully C. Knoles moved the College of the Pacific from San Jose to Stockton, California. At that time, the institution represented 17 of the current 18 departments in the College. There was also the Conservatory of Music and departments of education and engineering.

In 1961, the now broad-based university reverted to its original name, University of the Pacific, and "College of the Pacific" became the designation for the institution's college of arts, letters and sciences.
The College of the Pacific is now one of eleven schools and colleges that make up the University of the Pacific.

Education
The University of the Pacific's general education program is administered through the College of the Pacific. The program includes the Pacific Seminars series in which students meet in small groups to engage in discussion about what makes a good society. Two of the Pacific Seminars courses are taken in the freshman year and one is taken in the senior year. These seminars develop students' critical thinking skills through extensive writing and reading in addition to the class discussion.

The Pacific Seminars have gained national attention by the Association of American Colleges and Universities (AAC&U), a national organization devoted to undergraduate liberal arts education. AAC&U awarded Pacific a $25,000 grant for 2007-2009 to be part of a consortium of schools to promote the importance of personal and social responsibility as learning outcomes in higher education.

In 2006, the College of the Pacific was selected to host a new chapter of the Phi Beta Kappa Society. Typically, the College's students ranked in the top five percent academically are invited to join.

Centers
The College of the Pacific houses three Centers.   The John Muir Center promotes environmentalism and supports the study of naturalist John Muir. The John Muir Papers are part of the University of the Pacific Library's Holt-Atherton Special Collections.  The Jacoby Center for Public Service and Civic Leadership encourages the civic engagement of Pacific students and faculty through community service, research and internships. The Jacoby Center is responsible for the Sacramento Experience and Washington Semester internship programs, where students serve in California's state capital and the nation's capital, respectively. The Pacific Humanities Center promotes the value of art, music, theatre and film, as well as the traditional humanities disciplines—classical and religious studies, philosophy, literature and languages. The Humanities Center sponsors programs and events that highlight the importance of the humanities across the University and in the local community.

Facilities
Located in the Stockton, California campus, the College of the Pacific facilities include six computer labs and 62 science laboratories. Some of the science labs are part of the new Biology building that was completed in 2008. The Visual Arts department facilities include the Reynolds Art Gallery. Two theatres, with adjacent scenic and costume design facilities, include Long Theatre, a proscenium theatre seating approximately 380 audience members, and DeMarcus Brown Studio Theatre, a "black box" theatre accommodating up to 250. The various science departments have a range of specialized scientific instrumentation and equipment.

Degrees
The College of the Pacific primarily serves undergraduate students, who can earn B.F.A., B.A., and B.S. degrees.
However, the college also offers the graduate degrees of M.S., M.A., and a Ph.D.

References

External links
 University of the Pacific, Stockton, California
 College of the Pacific

University of the Pacific (United States)
Liberal arts colleges at universities in the United States
Educational institutions established in 1911
1911 establishments in California